Juliette Nana (born 16 August 2000) is a Burkinabé footballer, who plays as a midfielder for Hatayspor in the Turkish Women's Football Super League and the Burkina Faso women's national team.

Club career 
Nana has played for ZhFK Neman Grodno in Belarus.

In October 2022, she moved to Turkey, and signed with Hatayspor to play in the 2022–23 Super League.

International career 
Nana capped for Burkina Faso at senior level during the 2022 Africa Women Cup of Nations qualification).

References

External links 

2000 births
Living people
Sportspeople from Ouagadougou
Burkinabé women's footballers
Women's association football midfielders
Burkina Faso women's international footballers
Burkinabé expatriate footballers
Burkinabé expatriates in Belarus
Expatriate women's footballers in Belarus
Burkinabé expatriate sportspeople in Turkey
Expatriate women's footballers in Turkey
Turkish Women's Football Super League players
Hatayspor (women's football) players